The 1932 International Lawn Tennis Challenge was the 27th edition of what is now known as the Davis Cup. 22 teams would enter the Europe Zone; while 8 would enter the Americas Zone, 5 in North America and 3 in South America.

The United States defeated Brazil in the America Inter-Zonal Final, after Brazil received two walkovers in the South America Zone, and then defeated Germany in the Inter-Zonal play-off. France defeated the US in the Challenge Round, giving them their sixth straight title. The final was played at Stade Roland Garros in Paris, France on 29–31 July.

America Zone

North & Central America Zone

South America Zone

Americas Inter-Zonal Final
United States vs. Brazil

Europe Zone

Draw

Final
Italy vs. Germany

Inter-Zonal Zone
United States vs. Germany

Challenge Round
France vs. United States

See also
 1932 Wightman Cup

References

External links
Davis Cup official website

Davis Cups by year
 
International Lawn Tennis Challenge
International Lawn Tennis Challenge
International Lawn Tennis Challenge
International Lawn Tennis Challenge